The AA-1 class was a class of three experimental submarines of the United States Navy, built toward the end of World War I, between 1916 and 1919, intended to produce a high-speed fleet submarine. The design was not a success and none of the submarines saw active service. However, the lessons learned were applied to the design of the later V-boats. The class was later renamed as the T class.

Design 
In the early 1910s, only a dozen years after  inaugurated the Navy's undersea force, naval strategists had already begun to wish for submarines that could operate as long range reconnaissance vessels, in closer collaboration with the surface fleet than the Navy's existing classes, which had been designed primarily for coastal defense.

In the summer of 1913, Electric Boat's chief naval architect, former naval constructor Lawrence Y. Spear, proposed two preliminary fleet-boat designs for consideration in the Navy's 1914 program. In the ensuing authorization of eight submarines, Congress specified that one should "be of a seagoing type to have a surface speed of not less than twenty knots." This first fleet boat, laid down in June 1916, was named Schley after Spanish–American War hero Winfield Scott Schley. To achieve the required surface speed, two tandem  diesel engines on each shaft drove twin screws, and a separate diesel generator was provided for charging batteries. As the engines were clutched together, it was impossible to perfectly synchronize their operation.

The engineering plant included four New London Ship and Engine Company (NELSECO) four-cycle six-cylinder diesels,  each in two tandem pairs, and two Electro Dynamic main electric motors,  each, directly driven by the engines. Two 60-cell Exide batteries provided submerged power. One NELSECO four-cycle four-cylinder auxiliary diesel generator was included to charge batteries while the main engines were operating at high speed. From 1923 to 1927, T-3 was re-engined with two German-built Maschinenfabrik Augsburg Nürnberg AG (MAN) four-cycle ten-cylinder diesels,  each.

In addition to the usual four bow 18 inch (450 mm) torpedo tubes, the design incorporated two twin trainable external torpedo tubes in the deck superstructure, immediately forward and aft of the sail. These could fire on either broadside, but not dead ahead or dead astern. Two 3-inch (76 mm)/23 caliber retractable deck guns were also equipped. As with other contemporary US submarine designs, the AA-1 class was optimized for a high submerged speed, with a small sail and retractable deck guns. In August 1918 T-1 was experimentally rearmed with a single 4-inch (102 mm)/50 caliber non-retractable gun at the expense of the forward trainable torpedo tubes, probably to test the effect of a bigger gun on submerged speed as well as provide more anti-ship firepower. The 4 inch gun would later become standard on the S-class submarines. The trainable tubes were eliminated from the design by the time AA-2 and AA-3 were commissioned, and only AA-1 was so equipped.

Service 
They were based out of Hampton Roads, Virginia as part of Submarine Division 15 in the Atlantic Fleet and were used for training and maneuvers. On 23 August 1917, Schley was renamed AA-1 prior to launching, to free the name for the destroyer . On 17 July 1920, the three boats were reclassified as Fleet Submarines and given the hull numbers SF-1, SF-2, and SF-3. Their names were changed from the AA-series to T-1, T-2, and T-3 on 22 September 1920.

All three boats had been decommissioned by 1923 and placed into storage at Philadelphia, Pennsylvania. Between 1925 and 1927, T-3 was restored to service in order to test German-built diesels ( MAN engines), then returned to Philadelphia. All three were struck from the Naval Vessel Register on 19 September 1930 and sold for scrap on 20 November 1930.

Ships in class

USS Schley, AA-1, T-1 
 Designation: Submarine No. 52, SS-52, SF-1
 Builders:  (Fore River Shipbuilding in Quincy, Massachusetts)
 Laid down: 21 June 1916
 Launched: 25 July 1918 
 Operator: 
 Commissioned: 30 January 1920 
 Decommissioned: 5 December 1922 
 Fate: Sold for scrap 20 November 1930
 Operations: Trials and training

USS AA-2, T-2 

 Designation: Submarine No. 60, SS-60, SF-2
 Builders:  (Fore River Shipbuilding in Quincy, Massachusetts)
 Laid down: 31 May 1917
 Launched: 6 September 1919 
 Operator: 
 Commissioned: 7 January 1922 
 Decommissioned: 16 July 1923 
 Fate: Sold for scrap 20 November 1930
 Operations: Training

USS AA-3, T-3 
 Designations: Submarine No. 61, SS-61, SF-3
 Builders:  (Fore River Shipbuilding in Quincy, Massachusetts)
 Laid down: 21 May 1917
 Launched: 24 May 1919 
 Operator: 
 Commissioned: 7 December 1920 
 Decommissioned: 14 July 1927 
 Fate: Sold for scrap 20 November 1930
 Operations: Training, engine trials

See also 
 List of United States submarine classes

References

Citations

Bibliography 
 Gardiner, Robert, Conway's All the World's Fighting Ships 1906–1921, Conway Maritime Press, 1985. .
 Alden, John D., Crd U.S. Navy (Retired), The Fleet Submarine in the U.S. Navy A Design and Construction History, Naval Institute Press 1979. 
 Friedman, Norman "US Submarines through 1945: An Illustrated Design History", Naval Institute Press, Annapolis: 1995, .
 Silverstone, Paul H., U.S. Warships of World War I (Ian Allan, 1970), .
 Navsource.org fleet submarines page
 Pigboats.com AA-1-class (aka T-boats) page
 DiGiulian, Tony Navweaps.com 3"/23 caliber gun
 DiGiulian, Tony Navweaps.com 4"/50 caliber gun

External links 

Submarine classes